is a railway station in Akiha-ku, Niigata, Niigata Prefecture, Japan, operated by East Japan Railway Company (JR East).

Lines

Station layout
The station consists of one ground-level side platform serving a single bi-directional track. The station building by consists only of a small waiting room. The station is unattended.

History
The station opened on 20 February 1952. With the privatization of Japanese National Railways (JNR) on 1 April 1987, the station came under the control of JR East. The current station building dates from January 2001.

Surrounding area
Niitsu-Takiya Post Office
Niitsu High School

External links

 JR East station information 

Railway stations in Niigata Prefecture
Ban'etsu West Line
Railway stations in Japan opened in 1952
Railway stations in Niigata (city)